Gözde is a common feminine Turkish given name. In Turkish, "Gözde" means "Favorite", and/or "Dearest".

People
 Gözde Kırdar Sonsırma (born 1985), a Turkish volleyball player
 Gözde Yılmaz (born 1991), Turkish volleyball player
 Gözde Zay, Turkish fashion model
 Naşide Gözde Durmuş, Turkish scientist

Turkish feminine given names